Tutunendo is a Colombian district of the municipality of Quibdó , located in the department of Chocó . It is located 14 km from Quibdó , on the Quibdó - Medellín road. Declared a site of greater rainfall and Biodiversity. Its economic activities are: Agriculture, fishing, exploitation and extraction of minerals and wood resources and tourism in the weekend season by tourists, mostly from the city of Quibdó.

The township of Tutunendo ( Quibdó municipality ) is part of the Chocó Biogeographic and has an area of 43 square kilometers where much of the biodiversity is housed as it is a humid rain forest, which has made the area considered the main tourist center of the municipality of Quibdó, as an appropriate place for recreation and research for environmental entities.

Climate
Tutunendo has an extremely wet tropical rainforest climate (Af). It is one of the wettest places on earth.

References

Townships